Moon Dog Mane were a rock band from Sacramento, California, led by former Tesla guitarist Frank Hannon. The band released one album in 1998 entitled Turn it Up, which spawned two minor hits on US rock radio. In 1998, "Turn it Up" peaked at No. 36 on Billboard's Mainstream Rock chart, and in 1999 "I Believe" peaked at No. 38. The band broke up in 2000.

Members
 Brodie Stewart - vocals
 Frank Hannon - guitar
 Kevin Hampton - guitar
 Chris Martinez - keyboards
 Joel Krueger - bass
 Cortney DeAugustine - drums

External links
Review by The Cutting Edge

References

American southern rock musical groups
Musical groups from Sacramento, California